Self-deportation is an approach to dealing with illegal immigration, used in the United States and the United Kingdom, that allows an otherwise inadmissible person to voluntarily depart a country for which they have no legal ties to rather than face removal proceedings in front of the native court system.  It became associated with illegal immigration to the United States in the 1990s.

History
This term was used as early as 1984 in a People article about the film director Roman Polanski, which referred to his self-deporting. The term gained its current association with illegal immigration in the 1990s, especially in California. In 1994, William Safire described its usage by California governor Pete Wilson's immigration strategy, exemplified by Proposition 187, which prevented illegal aliens from using a variety of state social services. Safire summarized the philosophy of the approach as holding that "the most cost-effective way to change behavior is to make life unbearable under present behavior." The same year, Lalo Alcaraz and Esteban Zul launched a satirical campaign involving a character named "Daniel D. Portado" (a pun on deportado, Spanish for deported), who facetiously promoted self-deportation.

See also
 Immigration reduction in the United States
 Immigration reform
 Home Office hostile environment policy

References

Political terminology of the United States
Illegal immigration to the United States